Nemrut or Nemrud may refer to:

Places 
 Nemrut (mountain), a mountain near Adıyaman, Turkey
 Nemrut (volcano), a volcano near Lake Van in Turkey
 Lake Nemrut, a lake in the above volcano
 the modern location of Ancient Cyme (Aeolis)
 Nemrut Bay, an Aegean Turkish port near Izmir, Turkey

People
 Nemrut Mustafa Pasha

Other
 Nemrud, a 1979 Turkish film featuring Ali Şen

See also 
 Nimrud (disambiguation)
 Nimrod (disambiguation)